Saint Joan is a play by George Bernard Shaw about 15th-century French military figure Joan of Arc. Premiering in 1923, three years after her canonization by the Roman Catholic Church, the play reflects Shaw's belief that the people involved in Joan's trial acted according to what they thought was right.  He wrote in his preface to the play:

There are no villains in the piece. Crime, like disease, is not interesting: it is something to be done away with by general consent, and that is all [there is] about it. It is what men do at their best, with good intentions, and what normal men and women find that they must and will do in spite of their intentions, that really concern us.

Michael Holroyd has characterised the play as "a tragedy without villains" and also as Shaw's "only tragedy".  John Fielden has discussed further the appropriateness of characterising Saint Joan as a tragedy.

The text of the published play includes a long Preface by Shaw.

Characters

 Robert de Baudricourt
 Steward to de Baudricourt
 Joan
 Bertrand de Poulengy
 De la Trémouille, Lord Chamberlain
 Duchess de la Trémouille
 Archbishop of Rheims
 Gilles de Rais ("Bluebeard")
 Captain La Hire
 Bishop of Beauvais
 Dauphin, Charles VII

 Earl of Warwick
 Dunois, Bastard of Orléans
 Page to Dunois
 John de Stogumber, English chaplain
 Canon John D'Estivet
 Canon de Courcelles
 Brother Martin Ladvenu
 Brother John Lemaître, The Inquisitor
 Executioner
 English Soldier
 Gentleman

Plot
Shaw characterised Saint Joan as "A Chronicle Play in 6 Scenes and an Epilogue ". Joan, a simple peasant girl, claims to experience visions of Saint Margaret, Saint Catherine, and the archangel Michael, which she says were sent by God to guide her conduct.

Scene 1 (23 February 1429): Robert de Baudricourt complains about the inability of the hens on his farm to produce eggs. Joan claims that her voices are telling her to lift the siege of Orléans, and to allow her several of his men for this purpose. Joan also says that she will crown the Dauphin in Reims Cathedral. Baudricourt ridicules Joan, but his Steward feels inspired by her words. Baudricourt eventually begins to feel the same sense of inspiration, and gives his consent to Joan. The Steward enters at the end of the scene to exclaim that the hens have begun to lay eggs again. Baudricourt interprets this as a sign from God of Joan's divine inspiration.

Scene 2 (8 March 1429): Joan talks her way into being received at the court of the weak and vain Dauphin. There, she tells him that her voices have commanded her to help him become a true king by rallying his troops to drive out the English occupiers and restore France to greatness. Joan succeeds in doing this through her excellent powers of flattery, negotiation, leadership, and skill on the battlefield.

Scene 3 (29 April 1429): Dunois and his page are waiting for the wind to turn so that he and his forces can lay siege to Orléans. Joan and Dunois commiserate, and Dunois attempts to explain to her more pragmatic realities of an attack, without the wind at their back. Her replies eventually inspire Dunois to rally the forces, and at the scene's end, the wind turns in their favour.

Scene 4 (June 1429): Warwick and Stogumber discuss Joan's stunning series of victories. Joined by the Bishop of Beauvais, they are at a loss to explain her success. Stogumber decides Joan is a witch. Beauvais sees Joan as a threat to the Church, as she claims to receive instructions from God directly. He fears she wants to instill national pride in the people, which would undermine the Church's universal rule. Warwick thinks she wants to create a system in which the king is responsible to God only, ultimately stripping him and other feudal lords of their power. All agree that she must die.

Scene 5 (17 July 1429): the Dauphin is crowned Charles VII at Reims Cathedral. A perplexed Joan asks Dunois why she is so unpopular at court. He explains that she has exposed Very important person|very important people as incompetent and irrelevant. She talks to Dunois, Bluebeard, and La Hire about returning home. Charles, who complains about the weight of his coronation robes and smell of the holy oil, is pleased to hear this. She then says to Dunois "Before I go home, let's take Paris", an idea which horrifies Charles, who wants to negotiate a peace immediately. The Archbishop berates her for her "sin of pride". Dunois warns her that if she is captured on a campaign he deems foolhardy, no one will ransom or rescue her. Now realizing that she is "alone on earth", Joan declares that she will gain the strength to do what she must from the people and from God. She leaves, leaving the men dumbfounded.

Scene 6 (30 May 1431): deals with her trial. Stogumber is adamant that she be executed at once. The Inquisitor, the Bishop of Beauvais, and the Church officials on both sides of the trial have a long discussion on the nature of her heresy. Joan is brought to the court, and continues to assert that her voices speak to her directly from God and that she has no need of the Church's officials. This outrages Stogumber. She acquiesces to the pressure of torture at the hands of her oppressors, and agrees to sign a confession relinquishing the truth behind her voices. When she learns she will be imprisoned for life without hope of parole, she renounces her confession:

Joan: "You think that life is nothing but not being dead? It is not the bread and water I fear. I can live on bread. It is no hardship to drink water if the water be clean. But to shut me from the light of the sky and the sight of the fields and flowers; to chain my feet so that I can never again climb the hills. To make me breathe foul damp darkness, without these things I cannot live. And by your wanting to take them away from me, or from any human creature, I know that your council is of the devil."

Joan accepts death at the stake as preferable to such an imprisoned existence. Stogumber vehemently demands that Joan then be taken to the stake for immediate execution. The Inquisitor and the Bishop of Beauvais excommunicate her and deliver her into the hands of the English. The Inquisitor asserts that Joan was fundamentally innocent, in the sense that she was sincere and had no understanding of the church and the law. Stogumber re-enters, screaming and severely shaken emotionally after seeing Joan die in the flames, the first time that he has witnessed such a death, and realising that he has not understood what it means to burn a person until he has actually seen it happen. A soldier had given Joan two sticks tied together in a cross before the moment of her death. Bishop Martin Ladvenu also reports that when he approached with a crucifix to let her see it before she died, and he approached too close to the flames, she warned him of the danger from the stake, which convinced him that she could not have been under the inspiration of the devil.

Epilogue: 25 years after Joan's execution, a retrial has cleared her of heresy. Brother Martin brings the news to Charles VII. Charles then has a dream in which Joan appears to him. She begins conversing cheerfully not only with Charles, but with her old enemies, who also materialise in the King's bedroom. The visitors include the English soldier who gave her a cross. Because of this act, he receives a day off from Hell on the anniversary of Joan’s death. An emissary from the present day (the 1920s) brings news that the Catholic Church is to canonise her. Joan says that saints can work miracles, and asks if she can be resurrected. At this, all the characters desert her one by one, asserting that the world is not prepared to receive a saint such as her. The last to leave is the English soldier, who is about to engage in a conversation with Joan before he is summoned back to Hell at the end of his 24-hour respite. The play ends with Joan ultimately despairing that mankind will never accept its saints:

O God that madest this beautiful earth, when will it be ready to accept thy saints? How long, O Lord, how long?

Criticism

One historian at the time (1925) reacted to the play by arguing that it was highly inaccurate, especially in its depiction of medieval society.

Shaw states that the characterization of Joan by most writers is "romanticized" to make her accusers come off as completely unscrupulous and villainous.

More general interpretation of Joan's character is to describe her as a rebel against general institutional authority, such as that of the Catholic Church and to the feudal system.  Contemporary comments have noted her particularly strong form of religious belief and how it borders on religious fanaticism.

Tony Stafford discussed Shaw's use of imagery related to birds in the play.  Frederick Boas has compared the different treatments of Joan in dramas by Shakespeare, Schiller, and Shaw.

T. S. Eliot, discussing the play after its premiere in London in 1924, wrote that although Saint Joan was not the masterpiece that some claimed it to be, the play "seems to illustrate Mr. Shaw's mind more clearly than anything he has written before." And although he credited Shaw with providing an "intellectual stimulant" and "dramatic delight", he took issue with his portrayal of the heroine: "his Joan of Arc is perhaps the greatest sacrilege of all Joans: for instead of the saint or the strumpet of the legends to which he objects, he has turned her into a great middle-class reformer, and her place is a little higher than Mrs. Pankhurst" (the militant leader of the British suffragettes).

Productions
Shaw's personal reputation following the Great War was at a low ebb, and it is thought that he wanted to first test the play away from Britain. The play received its premiere on 28 December 1923 at the Garrick Theatre on Broadway by the Theatre Guild with Winifred Lenihan in the title role.  The London première, which opened on 26 March 1924 at the New Theatre, was produced by Lewis Casson and starred Shaw's friend Sybil Thorndike, the actress for whom he had written the part.  Costumes and sets were designed by Charles Ricketts, and the play had an extensive musical score, specially composed and conducted by John Foulds.

Caught between the forces of the Church and the Law, Joan is the personification of the tragic heroine and the part is considered by actresses (see below) to be one of the most challenging of roles to interpret.  It is usually played by very experienced actresses who are much older than the age of the character, a teenager.  For a film version, Joan was played by Jean Seberg, who was 19. The film and Seberg received strongly negative reviews. Seberg herself said she was “burned at the stake by the critics.”

Notable St. Joans
 Winifred Lenihan – Garrick Theatre, December 1923 – April 1924 (Initial production)
 Sybil Thorndike – London, March 1924 (Shaw wrote the play with her in mind)
 Katharine Cornell – Martin Beck Theatre, New York, March 1936 – May 1936 (Tyrone Power made a pre-Hollywood appearance)
 Wendy Hiller – Malvern Theatre Festival, Malvern, England, July 1936 (honoring Shaw's 80th birthday)
 Uta Hagen – Cort Theatre, New York, October 1951 – February 1952
 Siobhán McKenna – Phoenix Theatre, New York, December 1956 – January 1957, also came to England with this production. (Peter Falk appeared in a small part)
 Joan Plowright – London, 1963
 Sandra Seacat (as Sandra Kaufman) – Community Playhouse, Atlanta, February 12 – 24, 1965 (directed by Michael Howard, Seacat's erstwhile mentor, and featuring Actors Studio founding member William Hansen as The Inquisitor, this was the opening production of Atlanta's first—and last—annual "Fine Play Season")
 Jean Seberg – film, 1957..
 Diana Sands – Vivian Beaumont Theater, Lincoln Center, New York, January 1968 – February 1968
 Lynn Redgrave – Circle in the Square, New York, November 1977 – February 1978
 Imelda Staunton –  London, 1979
 Frances de la Tour – London, 1984
 Imogen Stubbs – London 1994
 Jacqueline McKenzie -- Sydney Opera House, Sydney Theatre Company, 1995
 Anne-Marie Duff – National Theatre, London 2007
 Amy Irving – sound recording, 2010
 Gemma Arterton – Donmar Warehouse, London 2016
 Lisa Dwyer Hogg – Lyric Theatre, Belfast 2016
 Condola Rashad – Manhattan Theatre Club, New York 2018

Other notable Joans include Judi Dench, Zoe Caldwell, Elisabeth Bergner, Constance Cummings, Ann Casson, Roberta Maxwell, Barbara Jefford, Pat Galloway, Sarah Miles, Ellen Geer, Jane Alexander, Lee Grant, Janet Suzman, Maryann Plunkett, Eileen Atkins, Kitty Winn and Sarah Snook.

Adaptations
Films

In 1927, Lee de Forest filmed Sybil Thorndike in the cathedral scene from Saint Joan in a short film made in his Phonofilm sound-on-film process.
In 1957, the play was adapted for film by Graham Greene, directed by Otto Preminger, with Jean Seberg as Joan of Arc, Richard Widmark, Richard Todd, and John Gielgud.

Television
In 1968 the BBC adapted the play for television as a Play of the Month.

Stage
Lanford Wilson's 2000 play Book of Days is a modern-day re-imagining of Saint Joan.

Sound recordings
Caedmon Records released a complete audio adaptation of the play in a four-record stereo LP boxed-set with full script booklet.  It starred Siobhán McKenna as Joan, Donald Pleasence as The Inquisitor, Felix Aylmer as Peter Cauchon and Alec McCowen as The Chaplain.
Blackstone Audio released a full-cast recording starring Amy Irving, Edward Herrmann, Kristoffer Tabori, Gregory Itzen, Armin Shimerman, Granville Van Dusen, among others. The production, which was directed by Yuri Rasovsky, won an Audie Award as Best Audio Drama of 2010.

Opera
The play has also been adapted into an opera by composer Tom Owen.

Awards and honors 
Awards
 2010 Audie Award for Best Audio Drama
 2008 Laurence Olivier Award for Best Revival
Nominations
 1993 Tony Award for Best Revival of a Play
 2018 Drama League Award for Outstanding Revival of Broadway or Off-Broadway Play
 2018 Tony Award for Best Actress in a Play – Condola Rashad

See also
 Cultural depictions of Joan of Arc

References
Notes

Sources
Dailey, Jeff. "The Villains Always Wear Red" Oscholar.com 2007  Accessed August 7, 2010

External links
 
 Full Text of the play
 Primary sources about Joan's male clothing in context
 Description of the physical Joan
 Discussion on Shaw's character and attitude to war
 Playing Joan interviews 
 

1923 plays
Broadway plays
Laurence Olivier Award-winning plays
Plays based on real people
Plays by George Bernard Shaw
West End plays
Works about Joan of Arc
Cultural depictions of Gilles de Rais
British plays adapted into films